In enzymology, an UDP-sugar diphosphatase is an enzyme that catalyzes the chemical reaction

UDP-sugar + H2O  UMP + alpha-D-aldose 1-phosphate

Thus, the two substrates of this enzyme are UDP-sugar and H2O, whereas its two products are UMP and alpha-D-aldose 1-phosphate.

This enzyme belongs to the family of hydrolases, specifically those acting on acid anhydrides in phosphorus-containing anhydrides.  The systematic name of this enzyme class is UDP-sugar sugarphosphohydrolase. Other names in common use include nucleosidediphosphate-sugar pyrophosphatase, nucleosidediphosphate-sugar diphosphatase, UDP-sugar hydrolase, and UDP-sugar pyrophosphatase.

Structural studies

References

 
 

EC 3.6.1
Enzymes of known structure